Eera Nilam is a 2003 Indian Tamil-language film directed by Bharathiraja, starring his son Manoj and Nanditha. It was released on 8 August 2003.

Plot

Cast

Soundtrack 
Soundtrack was composed by Sirpy and lyrics written by Na. Muthukumar, Thenmozhi, Snehan and Kabilan.

Reception 
Malathi Rangarajan of The Hindu wrote, "Bharathiraja has worked on R. Selvaraj's story and has come out with a screenplay that drags at times. But crisp, intelligent editing takes care of things". Visual Dasan of Kalki gave the verdict, "above average".

References

External links 
 

2000s Tamil-language films
2003 films
Films directed by Bharathiraja
Indian Army in films
Tamil Nadu State Film Awards winners